The 1929 Georgia Bulldogs football team represented the Georgia Bulldogs of the University of Georgia during the 1929 college football season. The Bulldogs completed the season with a 6–4 record. The season featured the first game in newly completed Sanford Stadium on October 12 (a victory over Yale) and Georgia's 100th loss (November 2 vs. Tulane).  In the 1920s, the Bulldogs compiled a record of 60–31–4 (a .653 winning percentage).

Schedule

References

External links
 Footage of Yale game

Georgia
Georgia Bulldogs football seasons
Georgia Bulldogs football